Girondins de Bordeaux won Division 1 season 1983/1984 of the French Association Football League with 54 points.

Participating teams

Auxerre
SEC Bastia
Bordeaux
Stade Brest
Stade Lavallois
RC Lens
Lille
FC Metz
AS Monaco
AS Nancy
FC Nantes Atlantique
Nîmes Olympique
Paris Saint-Germain FC
Stade Rennais
FC Rouen
AS Saint-Etienne
FC Sochaux
RC Strasbourg
Sporting Toulon Var
Toulouse FC

League table

Promoted from Division 2, who will play in Division 1 season 1984/1985
 Tours FC:Champion of Division 2, winner of Division 2 group B
 Olympique Marseille:Runner-up, winner of Division 2 group A
 RC Paris:Third place

Results

Relegation play-offs

|}

Top goalscorers

References

 Division 1 season 1983-1984 at pari-et-gagne.com

Ligue 1 seasons
France
1